Eoin Dunphy (born 1972) is an Irish hurler who formerly played with De La Salle GAA at club level and with Waterford GAA at inter-county level.  Dunphy won the All-Ireland Under 21 Hurling Championship with Waterford in 1992.

Honours
 All-Ireland Under 21 Hurling Championship winner - 1992
 Munster Under-21 Hurling Championship winner - 1992

Honours as Manager
 Waterford Senior Hurling Championship winner - 2008
 Munster Senior Club Hurling Championship winner - 2008

References

1972 births
Living people
Waterford inter-county hurlers
De La Salle hurlers
Hurling managers